Dreyer Farms is a Cranford, New Jersey produce farm. It was the winner of Edible Communities' New Jersey Farm local hero award in 2008.

History
The farm was started in 1904 by Gustav Dreyer and Henry Dreyer (died 1948) when they purchased adjacent farms on Springfield Avenue in Cranford, New Jersey.

References

External links
 

Cranford, New Jersey
Farms in New Jersey
1904 establishments in New Jersey